Stigmella vandrieli is a moth of the family Nepticulidae. It is only known from Yunnan, China.

The wingspan is 4.9-5.6 mm. Larvae have been found in October, adults were reared in October and November.

The larvae feed on Cyclobalanopsis glaucoides. They mine the leaves of their host plant. The mine consists of a contorted gallery, first filled with black frass, later with dispersed black frass, leaving narrow clear margins.

External links
Nepticulidae (Lepidoptera) in China, 1. Introduction and Stigmella (Schrank) feeding on Fagaceae

Nepticulidae
Moths of Asia
Moths described in 2000